The giant butterfly lizard (Leiolepis guttata) is a rarely seen species of lizard found in parts of Southeast Asia. It is the largest member of the genus Leiolepis.

References

 

Leiolepis
Reptiles described in 1829
Taxa named by Georges Cuvier